Grundy County is the name of four counties in the United States, all named in honor of Felix Grundy:

 Grundy County, Illinois 
 Grundy County, Iowa 
 Grundy County, Missouri 
 Grundy County, Tennessee